Gusevka 2nd is a rural locality (a settlement) in Novozhiznenskoye Rural Settlement, Anninsky District, Voronezh Oblast, Russia. The population was 179 as of 2010. There are 5 streets.

Geography 
Gusevka 2nd is located 40 km southeast of Anna (the district's administrative centre) by road. Alexandrovka is the nearest rural locality.

References 

Rural localities in Anninsky District